Te Pīhopatanga o Te Waipounamu (the bishopric of the South Island; also known as Te Hui Amorangi o Te Waipounamu, lit. the synod of the South Island) is an episcopal polity (or diocese) of the Anglican Church in Aotearoa, New Zealand and Polynesia based at premises at 290 Ferry Road in Christchurch. Te Pīhopatanga encompasses the South Island of New Zealand in its entirety and also Stewart Island/Rakiura and the Chatham Islands. According to the 2001 census there are approximately 15,000 Māori Anglicans within this area. Te Waipounamu is one of five pīhopatanga (episcopal units) that comprise Te Pīhopatanga o Aotearoa, the Māori Anglican Church in Aotearoa/New Zealand.

Ministry
There are 7 Ministry Units in Te Waiponamu.

Archdeaconry of Te Tau Ihu o Te Waka
Picton
Nelson

Archdeaconry of Whakatu
Blenheim

Archdeaconry of Motueka
Motueka

Archdeaconry of Te Tai Poutini
Takaka
Hokitika

Archdeaconry of Otautahi

Archdeaconry of Otepoti
Dunedin

Archdeaconry of Murihiku
Mataura
Invercargill

Structure
Te Pīhopatanga is governed by the Hui Amorangi, a representative synod that meets annually. The Executive Committee meets four times a year, as well as the meeting of the Hui Amorangi Trust Board.

Te Pīhopatanga comes under the episcopal leadership of te Pīhopa o (the Bishop of) Te Waipounamu.

Bishop
The first Pīhopa o (Bishop of) Te Waipounmau was John Gray, who was consecrated bishop in 1996 and died in November 2015.

Richard Wallace was nominated at the Electoral College of 23–25 September 2016 to be the second Pīhopa o (Bishop of) Te Waipounamu. He was duly consecrated on 21 January 2017 and installed that month.

References

Anglican dioceses in New Zealand